The 1963 BRSCC British Saloon Car Championship was a British motor racing series for Group 2 Touring Cars. The championship was contested over eleven races commencing on 30 March at Snetterton and concluding on 28 September at the same circuit. It was the sixth British Saloon Car Championship.

The championship was won by Jack Sears driving a Ford Cortina GT, a Ford Galaxie and a Ford Cortina Lotus.

Calendar & Winners
All races were held in the United Kingdom. Overall winners of multi-class races are shown below in bold.

Note: Cars competed in four classes:
 Class A: Up to 1300cc
 Class B: 1301 to 2000cc
 Class C: 2001 to 3000cc
 Class D: Over 3000cc

Championship results

References

British Touring Car Championship seasons
British Saloon